The Big Combo is a 1955 American film noir crime film directed by Joseph H. Lewis, written by Philip Yordan and photographed by cinematographer John Alton, with music by David Raksin. The film stars Cornel Wilde, Richard Conte and Brian Donlevy, as well as Jean Wallace, who was Wilde's wife at the time. The supporting cast features Lee Van Cleef, Earl Holliman and the final screen appearance of actress Helen Walker.

Plot
Police Lt. Leonard Diamond is on a personal crusade to bring down the sadistic gangster Mr. Brown. He is also dangerously obsessed with Brown's girlfriend, the suicidal Susan Lowell.  His main objective as a detective is to uncover what happened to a woman called "Alicia" from the crime boss's past.

Mr. Brown, his second-in-command McClure, and thugs Fante and Mingo kidnap and torture the lieutenant, then pour a bottle of alcohol-based hair tonic down his throat before letting him go. Diamond eventually learns through one of Brown's past accomplices, Bettini, that Alicia was actually Brown's wife. Bettini suspects that Alicia was sent away to Sicily with former mob boss Grazzi, then murdered, tied to the boat's anchor, and permanently submerged. Diamond questions a Swede named Dreyer, who was the skipper of that boat but now operates an antiques store as a front, bankrolled by Brown. Dreyer denies involvement and does not want to disclose anything to Diamond, but is nonetheless murdered by McClure shortly after leaving his shop later that day.

Diamond tries to persuade Susan to leave Brown and admits he might be in love with her. He shows her a photo of Brown, Alicia and Grazzi together on the boat. Susan finally confronts Brown about his wife and is told she is still alive in Sicily, living with Grazzi.

Brown orders a hit on Diamond. However, when his gunmen Fante and Mingo go to Diamond's apartment, they mistakenly shoot and kill Diamond's burlesque dancer girlfriend Rita instead. Diamond sees an up-to-date photo of Alicia but realizes it wasn't taken in Sicily (since there's snow on the ground). This leads Diamond to suspect Brown did not kill Alicia but his boss Grazzi instead. Diamond is able to track Alicia to a sanitarium, where she is staying under another name. He asks for her help.

Meanwhile, Brown's right-hand man, McClure, wants to take over. He plots with Fante and Mingo to ambush Mr. Brown, but they betray and murder him. McClure is dependent upon a hearing aid. Fante and Mingo dismantle it and machine gun McClure in pantomime silence, unable to hear his pleas for mercy.

At police headquarters, Brown shows up with a writ of habeas corpus, effectively preventing Alicia testifying against her husband. Brown also takes a big stash of "money" to Fante and Mingo while they are hiding out from the police, but the box turns out to contain a bomb that apparently kills both of them.

Brown shoots Diamond's partner, Sam, and kidnaps Susan, planning to fly away to safety. However, Mingo survived the assassination attempt by Brown, and he confesses to Diamond that Brown was behind all the murders while sobbing over the body of his cohort. Alicia is able to help Diamond figure out that Brown took Susan to a private airport where he intends to board his getaway plane.

However, Brown's plane does not show up and the film climaxes in a foggy hangar shootout. Susan shines the fog lamp from Brown's car in his eyes, effectively blinding him, allowing Diamond to arrest him. The last scene shows the silhouetted figures of Diamond and Susan in the fog, considered to be one of the iconic images of film noir.

Cast

 Cornel Wilde as Police Lt. Leonard Diamond
 Richard Conte as Mr. Brown
 Brian Donlevy as Joe McClure
 Jean Wallace as Susan Lowell
 Robert Middleton as Police Capt. Peterson
 Lee Van Cleef as Fante
 Earl Holliman as Mingo
 Helen Walker as Alicia Brown
 Jay Adler as Sam Hill
 John Hoyt as Nils Dreyer
 Ted de Corsia as Ralph Bettini 
 Helene Stanton as Rita
 Roy Gordon as Audubon
 Whit Bissell as Doctor (scenes deleted) (as Whit Bissel)
 Steve Michaell as Bennie Smith – Boxer
 Baynes Barron as Young Detective 
 James McCallion as Frank – Technician
 Tony Michaels as Photo Technician
 Brian O'Hara as Attorney Malloy
 Bruce Sharpe Detective
 Michael Mark as Fred – Hotel Clerk
 Philip Van Zandt as Mr. Jones (scenes deleted)
 Donna Drew as Miss Hartleby

Production

The film was initially called The Hoodlum based on a story by Philip Yordan. It was originally going to be directed by Hugo Fregonese for producer  Milton Sperling. Sperling tried to cast Spencer Tracy for the lead. The script was reportedly in great demand with Yordan apparently turning down offers of $75,000.

Eventually the film was a co production between Theodora, the production company of Cornel Wilde and Jean Wallace, and Security, a company of Phil Yordan and Sidney Harmon. Wilde changed the title to "The Big Combination" and Jean Wallace suggested it be shortened to "The Big Combo".

Jack Palance was originally cast opposite Wilde. Filming was brought forward to start September 7, because of studio space availability. Palance dropped out of the film, claiming he wanted a week off after finishing Victor Saville's The Silver Chalice (1954) with Virginia Mayo and Paul Newman in his first movie role. Another source says Palance was unhappy his wife was not cast in the second female lead. He was replaced by Richard Conte. Conte's casting meant the start date for another film, Cry Vengeance, had to be pushed back.

The film also marked the conclusion of Helen Walker's film career; she was consigned to a small role in The Big Combo.

The film was shot in 26 days.

Reception

Critical response

The staff at Variety magazine liked the film's direction, music and photography, despite "a rambling, not-too-credible plot."  They wrote, "Performances are in keeping with the bare-knuckle direction by Joseph Lewis and, on that score, are good. Low-key photography by John Alton, one of his best, and a jazz-derived score by David Raksin with solo piano by Jacob Gimpel are in keeping with the film's tough mood."

Reviews of the movie today are mostly positive. Chris Dashiell on the website CineScene finds the dialogue "run of the mill" but praises the film's director, writing that "Lewis had a remarkable ability to infuse poetry into the most banal material, and The Big Combo is one of his best efforts... it's not as startlingly inventive as Lewis's best film, Gun Crazy (1949), but it's a quality B-film, satisfying and dark."

Film critic Ed Gonzalez lauded the film in his review, writing, "Shadows and lies are the stars of The Big Combo, a spellbinding black-and-white chiaroscuro with the segmented texture of a spider's web ... John Alton's lush camera work is so dominant here you wouldn't know Joseph H. Lewis was also behind the camera. The story doesn't have any of the he-she psychosexual politicking that juices the director's Gun Crazy, but that's no loss given this film's richer returns. The set-pieces are fierce, as is the Casablanca tweak of the last shot, and Wallace's performance—a sad spectacle of a hurting creature caught between light and dark, good and evil—is one of noir's great unheralded triumphs."

Critics have compared the quality of The Big Combo to Fritz Lang's The Big Heat as one of the great film noir detective classics in terms of style. A number of critics have commented on the unusual (for the time) treatment of Mingo and Fante as a gay couple, with Robert Keser noting that Lewis "ruptures mid-century American sensibilities with his pair of tender gay-coded henchmen" and Robert Singer commenting on the message that "two gay men can experience a healthy relationship".

The review aggregator Rotten Tomatoes reported that 92% of critics gave the film a positive review, based on 13 reviews, with a weighted average of 7.04/10.

Home media
The film was released on Blu-ray in a new HD restoration in 2019 by Arrow Films in the UK and Eire.

Soundtrack
Most film noir movies feature scores that are orchestral, with strings. In contrast, The Big Combo is one of the few that have a score with brass and trumpets and with woodwinds and saxophones.

See also
Public domain film
List of American films of 1955
 List of films in the public domain in the United States

References

External links

 
 
 
 
 
 
 The Big Combo at Images Journal
 The Big Combo title sequence at Veoh (features David Raksin's music)

1955 films
1950s crime thriller films
Allied Artists films
American crime thriller films
American black-and-white films
1950s English-language films
Film noir
Films about organized crime in the United States
Films directed by Joseph H. Lewis
Films scored by David Raksin
American police detective films
1950s American films